Cavalcade (Fat Wreck Chords) is the third full-length studio album by The Flatliners. It was released on April 13, 2010. It features 12 songs, one of which (Filthy Habits) was previously released on their 7-inch EP Cynics. Following the same style as its predecessor, The Great Awake, the band continues to expand and mature with a punk rock sound as opposed to a ska punk sound shown in their debut album, Destroy to Create.

Reception

Exclaim! named Cavalcade the No. 4 Punk album of 2010. Exclaim! writer Aaron Zorgel said "The Flatliners have landed on a unique amalgamation of '90s skate punk and anthemic alt-rock. The end result is a record that carries all the intensity of Bad Religion, while maintaining the lyrical sensitivity of the Replacements"

Punknews.org called "Cavalcade' the best album of the year

Track listing 

"The Calming Collection"
"Carry the Banner"
"Bleed"
"Here Comes Treble" 
"He Was a Jazzman"
"Shithawks"
"Monumental"
"Filthy Habits"
"Liver Alone"
"Sleep Your Life Away"
"Count Your Bruises"
"New Years Resolutions"

Video 

Official Video-clip released for:
"Monumental (2010)"
"Carry The Banner (2010)"
"Count Your Bruises (2011)"

References

2010 albums
Fat Wreck Chords albums
The Flatliners albums